Five ships and a shore establishment of the Royal Navy have borne the name HMS Malabar, after Malabar, a region of India:

 HMS Malabar was a 54-gun fourth rate, previously the East Indiaman . The Admiralty purchased her in 1795, but she foundered under tow in 1796.
  was a 56-gun fourth rate, previously the East Indiaman Cuvera.  The Admiralty purchased her in 1804 and had her rebuilt as a 20-gun storeship in 1806. She was renamed HMS Coromandel in 1815 and transported convicts to Australia in 1819. From 1828 to 1853, when she was broken up, she served as a prison hulk in Bermuda, beginning a long association between this name and the colony.
  was a 74-gun third rate launched in 1818.  She was used as a coal hulk from 1848 and was renamed HMS Myrtle in 1883.  She was sold in 1905.
  was an iron screw troopship launched in 1866.  She became a base ship in 1897 and was renamed HMS Terror in 1901.  She was placed on the sale list in 1914 and was sold in 1918.
  was a succession of shore establishments in Bermuda between 1919 and 1951, and 1965 and 1995.

Other
  was a 20-gun sloop in Indian service in 1810.

Royal Navy ship names